Maria Grigoryevna Bolshakova (Russian: Мария Григорьевна Большакова; born in 1947), is a Russian politician who had served as the acting Governor of Ulyanovsk Oblast from 2004 to 2005.

Biography

Maria Bolshakova was born in Zabaluyka in 1947.

On 22 November 2004, Bolshakova was the acting governor of Ulyanovsk Oblast, until 6 January 2005, where Sergey Ivanovich Morozov, became the 3rd Governor of Ulyanovsk Oblast.

She became an honorary citizen of Ulyanovsk on 31 August 2016.

On 28 January 2021, she had supported the "Year of the Book: Time to Read" was held, organized by the Public Chamber of Ulyanovsk, organized by Governor Morozov, as he signed the document in September 2020.

References

1947 births
Living people
Russian politicians
Governors of Ulyanovsk Oblast
Acting heads of the federal subjects of Russia
Women heads of federal subjects of Russia